The Dirty Devil River is an  tributary of the Colorado River, located in the U.S. state of Utah. It flows through southern Utah from the confluence of the Fremont River and Muddy Creek before emptying into the Colorado River at Lake Powell.

Course

The Dirty Devil River is formed in Wayne County near Hanksville at the confluence of the Fremont River and Muddy Creek. It flows generally southward through a  canyon in Wayne and Garfield counties. Its lower  flows through Glen Canyon National Recreation Area, where it finally disembogues into the Colorado River at a point that is now submerged beneath Lake Powell.

The canyon carved by the river is particularly isolated and seldom visited compared to other natural areas in the region. The average discharge is approximately 446 cubic feet per second.

History

The Dirty Devil River was named by the 1869 Powell Geographic Expedition led by John Wesley Powell, which explored much of the Colorado River and its tributaries. It was named for the extreme salinity and turbidity of the water near its mouth. Powell later contrasted it with a much cleaner stream in the Grand Canyon, which he named Bright Angel Creek.

The outlaw Butch Cassidy and his gang used tributary canyons of the Dirty Devil, such as Robbers Roost, as a hideout in the 1890s.

Geology

The Dirty Devil River and its tributaries contribute approximately 150,000 tons of salt to the Colorado River each year, with the Muddy Creek tributary contributing an annual average of 86,000 tons by itself. The Fremont River tributary does not contribute significant amounts of salt. The United States Bureau of Reclamation has created a plan to reduce the salinity of the Dirty Devil River by collecting salty spring water and using deep-well injection to dispose of it. The plan, completed in 1987, has not been implemented due to its marginal cost effectiveness.

Bridges
The river is spanned by a bridge a few miles northwest of the Hite Crossing Bridge, a steel arch bridge over the Colorado River on State Route 95 near milepost 45 in Garfield County. It is also spanned by the Utah Hwy 24 bridge a few miles NE of Hanksville, UT, just downstream from the confluence of Muddy Creek and the Fremont river.

See also
List of Utah rivers
List of tributaries of the Colorado River

References

Tributaries of the Colorado River in Utah
Rivers of Utah
Rivers of Wayne County, Utah
Colorado Plateau
Rivers of Garfield County, Utah